Sant'Agata sul Santerno is a comune in the Province of Ravenna in the Italian region Emilia-Romagna, located about  east of Bologna and about  west of Ravenna, bordering the municipalities of Lugo and Massa Lombarda.

References

External links
 Official website

Cities and towns in Emilia-Romagna